Uva College Badulla (Uva Maha Vidyalaya) is a public school in Uva province, Sri Lanka which was founded in 1867. A national school, controlled by the central government (as opposed to the Provincial Council), it provides primary and secondary education. Uva College has supplied many undergraduates from Badulla District to local universities.

History
Uva College was the first school established in Uva province in 1867 by the Diocesan mission of Ceylon.
It is situated in the heart of Badulla town. From the inception the college had two halls and two dormitories with a science laboratory. Adjoining the office was the principal's quarters. The first principal was Mr. William. At first there were only twelve students and of these eight were Tamils. Seven students entered university. There were also several girls attending Advanced Level classes.

The medium taught at that time was English and one subject was taught either in Sinhala or Tamil. Then the college came under the tutelage of Christian fathers.

Status 
The school educates nearly 2,000 primary and secondary students in Sinhala. It is administratively divided into two sections: primary (grades 1–5) and secondary (grades 6–13). The school provides housing for boys. Its students have performed well in Ordinary and Advance Level Examinations, rating highly in provincial and island-wide rankings. Uva College facilities include science laboratories, an IT unit, a playground, a library, auditoriums and sports facilities.

Houses
Uva College assigns its students to one of four houses:

   Shaantha House
  Pragnya House
 Maithree House
  Weerya House

References

External links
Official SchoolNet website | uvacomlab.sch.lk

Buildings and structures in Badulla
National schools in Sri Lanka
Boys' schools in Sri Lanka
Educational institutions established in 1867
Schools in Badulla District
1867 establishments in Ceylon